Takahide (written: ,  or ) is a masculine Japanese given name. Notable people with the name include:

, Japanese naval aviator
, Japanese politician
, Japanese footballer
, Japanese footballer

Takahide is also a Japanese surname. Notable people with the surname include:

 (1929–2002}}, Japanese politician

Japanese-language surnames
Japanese masculine given names